The Orăștie is a left tributary of the river Mureș in Romania. It discharges into the Mureș near the town Orăștie.

The upper reach of the river is also known as Godeanu. The middle reach is locally known as Grădiștea or Beriu. The lower reach, downstream of the confluence with the Sibișel is known as Apa Orașului (meaning "Townwater")

Tributaries
The following rivers are tributaries to the river Orăștie (from source to mouth):

Left: Șes, Valea lui Brad, Valea Largă, Pustiosu, Pietrosu, Feierag
Right: Pârâul Alb, Anineș, Valea Rea, Valea Muții, Sibișel

References

Rivers of Romania
Rivers of Hunedoara County
Orăștie